The Seducers (also known as Swinging Young Seductresses) is a 1969 Italian erotic drama film co-written and directed  by Ottavio Alessi and starring Maud de Belleroche, Maurizio Bonuglia and Edwige Fenech.

Plot
The beautiful prostitute Ulla (Edwige Fenech) is hired by the despicable Mudy (Maud de Belleroche) and invited on a sea cruise where Ulla is meant to take the virginity of Mudy's son Tony, a shy and mentally disabled 20-year-old with a tendency toward pyromania. Also invited on the cruise are the provocative Paula (Rosalba Neri) and her husband Aldo (Bonuglia), who are constantly striving to win the favor of a wealthy woman in hope of obtaining an oil concession. Despite her efforts, Ulla has no effect on the young man until the yacht stops on a Mediterranean island inhabited only by a goat herder and his wife, Beba (Eva Thulin). Tony is attracted to her, but little by little his mental disorders arise, and the story ends in tragedy.

Cast 
 Rosalba Neri as Paola 
 Edwige Fenech as Ulla 
 Eva Thulin as Beba 
 Maud de Belleroche as Mudy 
 Maurizio Bonuglia as Aldo 
 Ruggero Miti as Tony 
 Salvatore Puntillo as Andro

References

External links

1960s erotic drama films
Italian erotic drama films
1969 drama films
1969 films
1960s Italian-language films
1960s Italian films